The Tees Valley Combined Authority (TVCA) is the combined authority for the Tees Valley urban area in England consisting of the following five unitary authorities: Darlington, Hartlepool, Middlesbrough, Redcar and Cleveland, and Stockton-on-Tees, covering a population of approximately 700,000 people. It was proposed that a combined authority be established by statutory instrument under the Local Democracy, Economic Development and Construction Act 2009. It is a strategic authority with powers over transport, economic development and regeneration including the flagship Teesside Freeport.

The Combined Authority was established on 1 April 2016, after Local Government Minister James Wharton MP signed the necessary Order. It was announced in October 2015 that voters in the region covered by the Authority would directly elect a Mayor in 2017.

History

The abolition of the non-metropolitan county of Cleveland in 1996 left the Tees Valley without a single authority covering the whole area, although some council functions continued to be provided jointly through Cleveland Police and the Cleveland Fire Service.

A combined authority was proposed in 2014 and sixty-five per cent of more than 1,900 responses received during a seven-week long public consultation were in favour of a combined authority.

A shadow combined authority was formed and chaired by Sue Jeffrey, Leader of Redcar and Cleveland Borough Council.

Membership
The authority consists of the five local authorities of Tees Valley as constituent members, the directly elected Mayor of Tees Valley as the Chair, and the Chairman of the Tees Valley local enterprise partnership as an associate member.

The membership of the combined authority is currently as follows:

See also
Cleveland (county)
Teesside
Tees Valley

References

External links

Tees Valley Unlimited LEP

Combined authorities
Local government in County Durham
Local government in North Yorkshire